Robert Magallanes (born August 18, 1969) is an American professional baseball coach for the Atlanta Braves of Major League Baseball.

Career
Magallanes attended Bell High School in Bell, California, and graduated in 1987. The Montreal Expos selected him in the 44th round of the 1987 MLB draft, but he did not sign, and enrolled at Cerritos College. The Seattle Mariners selected Magallanes in the 50th round of the 1989 MLB draft. He played in Minor League Baseball for 12 years, with six of them in the Mexican League. During the 1994–95 MLB strike, Magallanes was a replacement player for the Chicago Cubs.

Magallanes became a coach in the Los Angeles Angels' organization in 2002. He became the manager of the Cedar Rapids Kernals for the 2004 season. He was promoted to manage the Arkansas Travelers in 2007, and won the Texas League championship in 2008. He managed Arkansas through 2010 and then managed the Birmingham Barons in 2011 and 2012. He coached for Estrellas Orientales in the Dominican Winter League in 2013–14. He was hitting coach for the Lynchburg Hillcats in 2015 and the Arizona League Indians in 2016 and 2017. In 2018, he coached the Columbus Clippers. He coached the Gwinnett Stripers in 2019, and was brought up to the major leagues with the Atlanta Braves during September.

In 2021, the Braves promoted Magallanes to the major league coaching staff as assistant hitting coach. Magallanes was a member of the 2021 World Series champions.

Personal life
Bobby's older brother, Ever Magallanes, is also a baseball manager.

Magallanes is studying for a master's degree in performance psychology at National University.

See also
List of Major League Baseball replacement players

References

External links

Living people
1969 births
Baseball players from Los Angeles
Atlanta Braves coaches
Major League Baseball hitting coaches
San Bernardino Spirit players
Bellingham Mariners players
Peninsula Pilots players
Pueblo Bighorns players
Rio Grande Valley White Wings players
Broncos de Reynosa players
Diablos Rojos del México players
Jackson Generals (Texas League) players
Langosteros de Cancún players
Algodoneros de Unión Laguna players
Tigres del México players
Pericos de Puebla players
Sports coaches from Los Angeles